List of composers of Carnatic music, a subgenre of Indian classical music. Chronologically they can be grouped into 4 different Eras: Pre-Trinity Era, Trinity Era, Post Trinity Era and Modern Era. Composers are listed here based on this classification and their birth years are provided to the extent available.

Pre-Trinity Era Composers (17th Century and Prior) 
These are early stage composers that created the rules and foundations of classical music.
 Allama Prabhu (12th century)
 Andal (9th century)
 Arunagirinathar (b.1480)
 Bhadraachala Raama daasu (1620-1688)
 Jayadeva, (12th Century) - Composed Gita Govinda
 Prathama Vaggeyakara(First poet-composer) of Carnatic and Hindustani music forms to compose art music (in contrast to traditional bhakti poems) involving ragas; he is praised for his contributions to dance and music by his contemporary and later musicologists in their musical treatises
 Kanakadasa (1509-1609)
 Karaikkal Ammeiyar (7th century)
 Kshetrayya (1600-1680)
 Madhwacharya (12th century)
 Manikkavasagar (10th century)
 Muthu Thandavar (1525-1625)
 Naraharitirtha (1250-1333)
 Narayana Teertha (1650-1725)
 Padmanabha Tirtha (12th century)
 Papanasa Mudaliar (1650-1725)
 Paidala Gurumurti Sastri (17th century) - Composed over 1000 geethams
 purandaradasa (1484-1564)
 Raghavendra Swami (1595–1671)
 Sarangapani (1680-1750)
 Sripadaraya (1404-1502)
 Sundaramurti (7th century)
 Thirunavukkarasar (7th century)
 Tallapaka Annamacharya (1408-1503)
 Vadirajatirtha (1480-1600)
 Vijaya Dasa (1682–1755)
 Vyasatirtha (1460–1539)

Trinity Era Composers (18th Century) 
Composers of 18th Century started a new era in the history of Carnatic music with the introduction of new ragas, krithis and musical forms that are widely adopted and laid foundation for what we know today as Classical music. Trinity are the biggest contributors of this era even though there are a large number of musicians and composers that left their mark during this period.
 Arunachala Kavi (1711–1788)
 Ghanam Krishna Iyer (1790–1854)
 Gopala Dasa (1722–1762)
 Iraiyamman Tampi (1782–1856)
 Jagannatha Dasa (1728–1809)
 Kaiwara Sri Yogi Nareyana (1730-1840) 
 Krishnarajendra Wodeyar III (1799–1868)
 Marimutthu Pillai (1717–1787)
 Muthuswami Dikshitar (1775–1835)
 Mysore Sadasiva Rao (b. 1790)
 Oottukkadu Venkata Kavi (1700–1765)
 Pacchimiriam Adiyappa (early 18th century)
 Sadasiva Brahmendra (18th century)
 Thyagaraja Swami (1767–1847)
 Tiruvarur Ramaswami Pillai (1798–1852)
 Ramaswami Dikshitar (1735-1817)
 Syama Sastri (1762–1827)

Post-Trinity Era Composers (19th Century) 
 Ajjada Adibhatla Narayana Dasu (1864–1945)
 Primary contribution is in the area of Hari katha. Also created several krithis as  part of the hari kathas he authored
 Ambi Dikshitar (1863-1936) 
 Propagated Muthuswami Dikshitar compositions and helped bring them into modern era
 Also used the mudra of guruguha for about 10 compositions we have available at this time
 Anai Ayya brothers
 Annamalai Reddiyar (1865–1891)
 Cheyyur Chengalvaraya Sastri (1810-1900)
 Chittor Subrahmanya Pillai (1898-1975)
 Dharmapuri Subbarayar
 Composed more than 50 Javalis
 Ennappadam Venkatarama Bhagavatar (1880–1961)
 Gopalakrishna Bharathi (1811–1896)
 Jayachamaraja Wodeyar (1919–1974)
 Kavi Kunjara Bharati (1810–1896)
 Koteeswara Iyer (1870–1940)
 Composed in all 72 melakarta raagas
 Kotthavaasal Venkatarama Ayyar (1810-1880)
 Maha Vaidyanatha Iyer (1844–1893)
 Composed Mela raga maalika
 Manambuchavadi Venkatasubbayyar
 Mayuram Viswanatha Sastri (1893–1958)
 Muthiah Bhagavatar (1877–1945)
 Mysore T. Chowdiah (1894–1967)
 Mysore Vasudevacharya (1865–1961)
 Neelakanta Sivan (1839–1900)
 Pallavi Seshayyar (1842–1905)
 Papanasam Sivan (1890–1973)
 Patnam Subramania Iyer (1845–1902)
 Pattabhiramayya (b. 1863)
 Poochi Srinivasa Iyengar (1860–1919)
 Rallapalli Anantha Krishna Sharma (1893–1979)
 Subbarama Dikshitar (1839–1906)
 Subbaraya Sastri (1803–1862)
 Son of Shyama Shastri and First generation disciple of Tyagaraja
 Mahakavi Subramanya Bharathiyar (1882–1921)
 Shuddhananda Bharati (1897–1990)
 Swathi Thirunal || (1813–1846)
 Thanjavur Quartet (1801–1856)
 Tiger Varadachariar (1876–1950)
 Tiruvottriyur Tyagayya (1845–1917) 
 Son of Veena Kuppayya
 Veena Kuppayya (1798–1860)
 First generation disciple of Tyagaraja
 Veene Sheshanna (1852–1926)

Modern Era Composers (20th Century and beyond) 
A. Kanyakumari
Ambujam Krishna (1917-1989)
Annavarapu Rama Swamy (b.1926)
G. N. Balasubramaniam (1910-1965)
Kalyani Varadarajan (1923-2003)
 Composed in all 72 Melakarta ragas
Lalgudi Jayaraman (1930-2013)
M.Balamuralikrishna (1930-2016)
Composed in all 72 melakarta ragas and created several new ragas including those with fewer than 5 notes
M. D. Ramanathan (1923-1984)
Maharajapuram Santhanam (1928-1992)
N. Ravikiran (b.1967)
Composed in all 35 Sulaadi talas
N. S. Ramachandran (b.1908)
Nallan Chakravartula Krishnamacharyulu (1924–2006)
Samavedam Shanmukha Sarma (b.1967)
Composed only lyrics. Music is set by a few contemporary musicians
Suguna Purushothaman (1941-2015)
Composed navagraha krithis in Tamil
T. V. Gopalakrishnan (1932 - Present)
T. R. Subramaniam (1929-2013)

Pre-Trinity composers (Born in 17th Century or earlier)

Trinity-Age composers (Born in 18th century) 
These composers lived during the time of the Trinity and there are recorded instances of their interaction with the Trinity.

19th century Composers

Modern-age Composers (Born in 20th century and beyond) 
{|class="wikitable"
! Composer !! Years !! Languages !! Approx. 
Number of Compositions 
!Signature(Insignia)
!Other Info
|-
| G. N. Balasubramaniam || 1910-1965 || Telugu, Sanskrit, Tamil || 250
|None|| Did not use a mudra; Ranjani Niranjani, Saraswati Namostute, and Sri Chakra Raja Nilaye are popular compositions.
|-
| Ambujam Krishna || 1917-1989 || Kannada, Telugu, Sanskrit, Tamil || 600|None|| Did not use a mudra; Her songs have been set to tune by leading Carnatic musicians.
|-
| M. D. Ramanathan || 1923-1984 || Telugu, Sanskrit, Tamil, Malayalam || 300 
|varadasa|| Composed in all popular ragas; Used signature "Varada dasa"; Disciple of Tiger Varadachariar
|-
|Kalyani Varadarajan
|1923-2003|Telugu, Sanskrit, Tamil|1000 +|kalyani|Composed in all 72 Melakarta raagas; Used signature "Kalyani"
Composed songs on many deities, mainly Sholinganallur Narasimhar, Sholinganallur Anjaneyar, Thayars, and most all Devis.
|-
| M.Balamuralikrishna    ||1930-2016 || Telugu, Kannada, Sanskrit, Tamil || 400 
|murali|| Composed in all 72 Melakarta raagas; Used signature "Muraligana"; 
Created several ragas, with 4 notes and 3 notes; Invented a new Tala system; 

Disciple of Parupalli Ramakrishnayya Pantulu, 

a direct descendant of the shishya parampara (lineage of disciples) of Tyagaraja.
|-
| Lalgudi Jayaraman || 1930-2013 || Telugu, Sanskrit, Tamil || 100|None|| His sparkling thillana are especially popular and a staple of Carnatic music concerts.
|-
|Mahesh Mahadev
|present
|Sanskrit, Kannada|
|Sri Skanda|Created many new ragas and composed kritis, varnams and devaranama 
|-
|Mysore Manjunath
| present
|Instrumental
|
|
|Manjunath has created many New ragas including Yaduveera Manohari, Bharatha.
|-
|}

 Other composers 
 Rallapalli Anantha Krishna Sharma (1893–1979)
 N. S. Ramachandran
 Shishunala Sharif
 Madurai N. Krishnan

 Other composers in Mysore Kingdom 

 Veene Sheshanna (1852–1926)
 Rallapalli Anantha Krishna Sharma (1893–1979)
 Mysore T. Chowdiah (1894–1967)
 Jayachamaraja Wodeyar (1919–1974)
 Tiger Varadachariar (1876–1950)

Other composers—Bhakti Saints

In addition to the above composers, various Bhakti'' saints of medieval India also composed devotional hymns, verses and songs. First six composer used ancient Tamil music [pannicai] which later evolved to the Carnatic musical tradition over the centuries.

 Karaikkal Ammeiyar (7th century)
 Thirunavukkarasar (7th century)
 Thirugnana Sambanthar (7th century)
 Sundaramurti (7th century)
 Andal (9th century)
 Manikkavasagar (10th century)
 Madhwacharya (12th century)
 Padmanabha Tirtha (12th century)
 Allama Prabhu (12th century)
 Muthu Thandavar (14th century)
 Sripadaraja (14th century)
 Vyasatirtha (1460–1539)
 Vadirajatirtha (1480–1600)
 Narayana Teertha (1580–1660)
 Kanakadasa  (1509–1609)
 Raghavendra Swami (1595–1671)
 Vijaya Dasa (1682–1755)

See also

 List of composers who created ragas
 List of Carnatic instrumentalists

References

External links
 http://www.thehindu.com/arts/music/article2618959.ece#.Tr5zbWkGd-A.email
 https://web.archive.org/web/20151225101816/http://saaranimusic.org/vaggeya/vaggeyakarulu.php

 
Lists of composers
India music-related lists